The Oxfordshire RFU County Cup is an annual rugby union knock-out club competition organised by the Oxfordshire Rugby Football Union.  It was first introduced during the 1970–71 season, with the inaugural winners being Oxford.  It is the most important rugby union cup competition in Oxfordshire, ahead of the Oxfordshire RFU County Shield.

The County Cup is open to club sides based in Oxfordshire playing in tier 6 (South West 1 East) and tier 7 (Southern Counties North) of the English rugby union system, 2nd teams of higher ranked clubs in the county (tiers 3–4), as well as invitee sides from outside of the league structure (e.g. university representative sides).  The current format is a knock-out competition with a preliminary round, first round, semi-finals and a final played at Iffley Road in Oxford in March–April.

Oxfordshire RFU County Cup winners

Number of wins
Henley Hawks (11)
Oxford (11)
Chinnor (7)
Banbury (6)
Oxford Harlequins (6)
Oxford Old Boys (3)
Bicester (2)
Grove (1)
Oxford University Greyhounds (1)

Notes

See also
 Oxfordshire RFU
 Oxfordshire RFU County Shield
 English rugby union system
 Rugby union in England

References

External links 
Oxfordshire RFU website

Recurring sporting events established in 1970
1970 establishments in England
Rugby union in Oxfordshire